Mercy Christmas is a 2017 American comedy-horror film, written by Ryan Nelson and Beth Levy Nelson and directed by Ryan Nelson. The film was acquired by Gravitas Ventures in 2017 and was released on November 28, 2017.

Plot
Michael Briskett thinks that he meets the perfect woman, his Christmas dream comes true when she invites him to her family's holiday celebration. However, Michael struggles to survive once he realises that he will be the Christmas dinner.

Cast
 Steven Hubbell as Michael Briskett
 Cole Gleason as Andy Robillard
 Whitney Nielsen as Katherine
 Casey O'Keefe as Cindy Robillard
 D.J. Hale as Eddie
 Ryan Boyd as Bart Robillard
 David Ruprecht as Abe Robillard
 Gwen Van Dam as Granny
 Dakota Shephard as Denise
 Joey Keane as Phillip

Production and release
Mercy Christmas was produced by No Mercy Pictures in collaboration with Other Paw Films. The film is Nelson's debut directorial feature. Filming was completed in Los Angeles during 2016, and traditional special-effects makeup was used to create the gory scenes. The film was acquired by Gravitas Ventures in August 2017 and premiered at the Shriekfest Film Festival in Los Angeles in October 2017.

It was released on VOD on November 28, 2017.

Reception
The film received positive critical reviews from multiple media outlets following its premiere. Dread Central described it as “without a doubt, among the best the sub-genre [comedy-horror] has to offer.” Horror Freak News called it a “new holiday horror classic." Ink and Code stated: "It might have been the most I've laughed during a horror movie. Or maybe the most revolted I’ve been during a comedy. From the start, it establishes its own bizarre tone and fully commits to it for the rest of the film. It is thoroughly surreal as it oscillates from gut-busting laughs to wince-inducing violence." Film Stage acknowledged its efficacy in the sub-genre of comedy-horror, saying, "Nelson effectively mixes genre tropes with the mundane life of an office worker. He combines a psychological horror scenario (office work futility) that's ripe with humor and a graphic horror aesthetic (prisoners of a cannibalistic clan) to embrace the absurdity inherent to both."

Awards and nominations
In 2017, Mercy Christmas won the Best Kill Award at the Sin City Horror Festival in Las Vegas, Nevada and was nominated for the Best Comedy Award at the Buffalo Dreams Fantastic Film Festival in Buffalo, New York.

References

External links
 
 

2017 films
2017 horror films
2010s Christmas horror films
American Christmas horror films
American comedy horror films
2017 comedy horror films
2017 comedy films
2010s English-language films
2010s American films
Films about cannibalism